The Tempe Challenger is a professional tennis tournament played on hard courts. It is currently part of the ATP Challenger Tour. It is held annually in Tempe, Arizona, United States since 2017.

Past finals

Singles

Doubles

External links
 Official website

ATP Challenger Tour
Hard court tennis tournaments in the United States
Tennis tournaments in Arizona